Metriochroa inferior is a moth of the family Gracillariidae. It is known from Eritrea.

The larvae feed on Olea chrysophylla. They probably mine the leaves of their host plant.

References

Endemic fauna of Eritrea
Phyllocnistinae
Moths of Africa
Moths described in 1915